Platanitis is a settlement belonging to the community of Molykreio in Nafpaktia, Aetolia-Acarnania, Greece. At the 2011 census, the village had 606 inhabitants.

Geography
Platanitis is situated at the northwestern shore of the Gulf of Corinth,  about 4 km northeast of Antirrio and the Rio–Antirrio bridge and 6.5 km southwest of Nafpaktos. The Greek National Road 48/E65 (Antirrio-Nafpaktos-Livadeia) runs through the village. There is a stone bridge over the small stream Platanorema (Kakavos), built in the late 19th century. Uphill towards the northwest is the smaller settlement of Ano Platanitis, also part of the community of Molykreio.

History
In 1951 Platanitis was recognized as a settlement within the community of Molykreio. In 1989, it became part of the municipality of Antirrio and in 2011 it became part of the municipality of Nafpaktia.

Historical population

References

Populated places in Aetolia-Acarnania
Nafpaktia